Mann-Simons Cottage is a historic home located at Columbia, South Carolina. It was built around 1850, and is a -story, cottage style frame house on a raised basement. The front façade features a porch supported by four Tuscan order columns. It was the antebellum home of a substantial free black Columbia family.

The house now serves as a museum, with tours offered six days a week.

It was added to the National Register of Historic Places in 1973.

References

External links
 Manns-Simons Site - Historic Columbia Foundation

Houses on the National Register of Historic Places in South Carolina
Houses completed in 1850
Houses in Columbia, South Carolina
National Register of Historic Places in Columbia, South Carolina
Museums in Columbia, South Carolina
Historic house museums in South Carolina
African-American museums in South Carolina